

Edward Richard Taylor RBSA (14 June 1838 – 11 January 1911) was an English artist and educator. He painted in both oils and watercolours. He became a member of the Royal Birmingham Society of Artists in 1879.

Biography

Taylor taught at the Lincoln School of Art, where amongst his pupils were William Logsdail and Frank Bramley, and became influential in the Arts and Crafts movement as the first headmaster at the Birmingham Municipal School of Arts and Crafts from 1877–1903. In December 1898, he founded Ruskin Pottery at Smethwick, Staffordshire. Since 2003, the work of this artist has been auctioned with one painting, The Avon from Bideford, sold at Andrew Hartley Fine Arts in 2012 for a record price.

His son William Howson Taylor (1876–1935) took over Ruskin Pottery after the death of his father in 1912.

See also
Birmingham Group

Notes

Further reading

Atterbury, Paul & Henson, John. Ruskin Pottery: Pottery of Edward Richard Taylor and William Howson Taylor, 1898-1933 (Baxendale press, 1993).

External links
Paintings by E R Taylor (artnet.com)

1838 births
1911 deaths
19th-century English painters
English male painters
20th-century English painters
English watercolourists
Landscape artists
Members and Associates of the Royal Birmingham Society of Artists
Art pottery
19th-century English male artists
20th-century English male artists